William "Mickey" Stevenson (born January 4, 1937) is an American former songwriter and record producer for the Motown group of labels from the early days of Berry Gordy's company until 1967.

Life and career
He was born William Stevenson and, after spending his formative years recording doowop and gospel music, joined Tamla/Motown in 1959, the year it was founded. He was head of the A&R department there during the company's "glory" years of the mid-1960s when artists such as the Supremes, Marvin Gaye, the Temptations, Four Tops, Stevie Wonder and Martha & the Vandellas came to the fore. Stevenson was also responsible for organizing and establishing the company's in-house studio band, which came to be known as the Funk Brothers.

He wrote and produced many hit records for Motown, some with co-writer and producer Ivy Jo Hunter. They included his biggest successes, "Dancing in the Street", which he co-wrote with Hunter and Marvin Gaye; "It Takes Two" (Gaye and Weston), "Ask the Lonely" for the Four Tops, Jimmy Ruffin's "What Becomes of the Brokenhearted" (produced), "My Baby Loves Me" (Martha & the Vandellas), "Uptight (Everything's Alright)" (produced) for Stevie Wonder and Gaye's first hit, "Stubborn Kind of Fellow". He also wrote "Devil with the Blue Dress On" in 1964 with Shorty Long, which became a hit for Mitch Ryder and the Detroit Wheels in 1966. He also wrote under the pseudonym Avery Vandenburg for Jobete's Stein & Van Stock publishing subsidiary.

In 1969, he founded a label called People Records, which recorded Kim Weston and other acts such as Hodges, James & Smith, but the label dissolved around the time James Brown's unrelated label of the same name was founded in 1971. He was appointed head of Venture Records in 1969, a subsidiary of MGM, with a brief to develop their share of the soul and rhythm and blues market, continuing in this role until the mid-1970s. Subsequently, he owned another California label, Raintree, releasing a single by Willard King in 1975.

In recent years, Stevenson discovered and produced the R&B female artist Jaisun for an album that reached No. 1 in major breakout markets, but he has largely been involved in producing stage musicals. The latter include Swann, Showgirls, Wings and Things, The Gospel Truth, TKO, and Chocolate City. He married Michelle Stevenson on November 11, 2021.

Chart hits and other notable songs written by William “Mickey” Stevenson

References

1937 births
Living people
Motown artists
Record producers from Michigan
Songwriters from Michigan
American male songwriters